Number Four may refer to:

 4 (number), a number, numeral, and glyph
 A hamlet in the town of Watson, New York
 #4, the pseudonym of American musician Jim Root, when performing with Slipknot
 A character from the Earthworm Jim video games and animated series
 Numbuh Four, a character from Codename: Kids Next Door
 A predominantly defensive position in polo
 Jean Béliveau (1931-2014), Canadiens hockey player, frequently known by his sweater number, number 4
 A character also known as Simon in the reimagined Battlestar Galactica
 A character in the 2011 film I Am Number Four, based on the 2010 book of the same name
 "Number Four" (single), a 2013 single by My Chemical Romance

See also
 Four (disambiguation)